Ruse Province, or Rusenska Oblast (former name Ruse okrug) is a province in northern Bulgaria, named after its main city, Ruse, neighbouring Romania via the Danube. It is  divided into 8 municipalities with a total population, as of February 2011, of 235,252 inhabitants.

The Danube Bridge, one of only two bridges opened over the Danube, is located in the province. One of the versions of a folk song, inspired by the Ruse blood wedding, can be heard in the province.

Municipalities

The Ruse province (oblast) contains eight municipalities (obshtina; plural , obshtini). The following table shows the names of each municipality in English and Cyrillic, the main town (in bold) or village, and the population of each as of December 2009.

Demographics

The following table represents the change of the population in the province after World War II:

Ethnic groups

Total population (2011 census): 235 252

Ethnic groups (2011 census):
Identified themselves: 216,612 persons:
Bulgarians: 176,413 (81,44%)
Turks:  28,658 (13,23%)
Romani: 8,615 (3,98%)
Others and indefinable: 2,926 (1,35%)

Ethnic groups according to the 2001 census, when 266,157 people of the population of 266,213 of Rousse Province identified themselves (with percentage of total population):
Bulgarians: 213,408
Turks: 37,050
Romani: 9,703

Religion

Religious adherence in the province according to 2001 census:

See also
Provinces of Bulgaria
List of villages in Rousse Province

References

External links 
 Ruse Province
 Ruse municipality
 Guide Bulgaria - Rousse District
 Information about the Ruse region

 
Provinces of Bulgaria